"I Can't Help It (If I'm Still in Love with You)" is a song written and originally recorded by Hank Williams on MGM Records. It hit number two on the Billboard country singles chart in 1951.  In his autobiography, George Jones printed the first six lines of the song and stated, "Its lyrics couldn't be more simple - or profound."

Recording and composition
According to Colin Escott's 2004 book Hank Williams: The Biography, fiddler Jerry Rivers always claimed that Hank wrote the song in the touring Sedan, and when he came up with the opening line, "Today I passed you on the street," and then asked for suggestions, steel guitarist Don Helms replied, "And I smelled your rotten feet." The song was recorded at Castle Studio in Nashville, Tennessee, on March 16, 1951, and issued as MGM catalog No. 10961.

Williams was backed on the session by members of his Drifting Cowboys band, including: Rivers, Helms, Sammy Pruett (electric guitar), Jack Shook (rhythm guitar), Ernie Newton or "Cedric Rainwater" aka Howard Watts (bass), and either Owen Bradley or producer Fred Rose on piano. It was released as the B-side of "Howlin' at the Moon", but on the strength of its simple language and passionate singing, soared to number two on the Billboard Country Singles chart.

Williams sang the song with Anita Carter on the Kate Smith Evening Hour on April 23, 1952.  The rare television appearance is one of the few film clips of Williams in performance.

Chart performance

Notable cover versions 
Many artists have covered the song. Among the most successful are the following:

 Guy Mitchell's 1951 version peaked at No. 28 on Billboard charts. 
 Johnny Tillotson's 1962 rendition reached No. 24 on the U.S. Billboard Hot 100 and No. 8 on the Adult Contemporary chart.
 Skeeter Davis recorded the track in 1965. Her version was released as a single and peaked at number 26 on the U.S. Billboard Bubbling Under Hot 100 singles chart the same year.
 Linda Ronstadt covered the song on her 1974 album Heart Like a Wheel, reaching No. 2 on the U.S. Country chart. Her version won her the Grammy for Best Country Vocal Performance, Female.
 Cat Power covered the song on their 1996 album Myra Lee as "Still in Love".
 Elvis Presley recorded a demo of the song in 1961 which was not released until 1997 on his Platinum - A Life In Music box set.

References

1951 songs
1951 singles
1962 singles
1974 singles
Hank Williams songs
Songs written by Hank Williams
Linda Ronstadt songs
Song recordings produced by Fred Rose (songwriter)
MGM Records singles
Cadence Records singles
Capitol Records singles